La Ensenada is a corregimiento in Balboa District, Panamá Province, Panama with a population of 94 as of 2010. Its population as of 1990 was 97; its population as of 2000 was 89.

References

Corregimientos of Panamá Province